EC2 or EC-2 may refer to:

Amazon Elastic Compute Cloud (EC2), a commercial web service for hosting computer applications
Cardoen EC-2 mine, an anti-personnel mine
Cessna EC-2, a 1930s aircraft
EC2, a district in the London EC postcode area
EC2-S-C1, U.S. World War II Liberty ships
 Escadre de Chasse 2, a flight of the French Air Force's Escadron de Chasse 01-002 "Cigognes"
Eurocode 2, an alternative name for European reference norm EN 1992
EC2 or ECII, a musical project produced by Mick Ronson
Erg Chech 002, a meteorite 
EC2, a 2019 mixtape by Coi Leray